"Talk Me Down" (stylized in all caps) is a song by Australian singer and songwriter Troye Sivan from his debut studio album Blue Neighbourhood (2015). It was written by Sivan, Bram Inscore, Brett McLaughlin, Allie X, and Emile Haynie, and was produced by Haynie and Inscore. The song was first released as a promotional single along with the pre-order of the album on 16 October 2015, and was released as the third official single on 26 May 2016.

Critical reception
"Talk Me Down" has received generally positive reviews from critics, who praised its mature themes and dramatic production. In a review of Blue Neighbourhood, Everett True of The Guardian wrote that "the spine-chilling Talk Me Down out-Macklemore’s [sic] Macklemore with its unashamed and unforgiving look at the lasting effects of homophobia."

Jules Lefevre of Rolling Stone Australia complimented the song's pop sensibilities, writing that the "pillowy" and "orchestral" sound of "Talk Me Down" is bellied by an "unshakeable chorus hook." The Herald Sun called the song's melancholic production "glorious" and "perfect for the story being told."

Music video 
The music video for "Talk Me Down" is the third and final installment in Sivan's "Blue Neighbourhood" trilogy. It was directed by Tim Mattia and premiered 20 October 2015.

Live performances
"Talk Me Down" is included in the setlist for Sivan's Blue Neighbourhood Tour, serving as the thirteenth and final song in the standard set. His performance of the track was cited as a highlight of the show by Megan Downing of MTV UK, who attended the 19 April 2016 show at the O Shepherd's Bush Empire in London, England and wrote that "Talk Me Down" "gave us ALL the feels."

Charts

Certifications

Release history

Notes

References

2015 songs
2016 singles
Troye Sivan songs
EMI Records singles
LGBT-related songs
Songs written by Emile Haynie
Song recordings produced by Emile Haynie
Songs written by Leland (musician)
Songs written by Troye Sivan
Music videos shot in Toronto